Hottonia palustris, also water violet or featherfoil, is an aquatic plant in the family Primulaceae.

Description

Its basal roots are buried in the underlying mud, while other silvery, shiny roots dangle freely in the water. The leaves are deeply divided as far as the central vein, like the teeth of a double comb, and are completely submerged, but can surface after a drastic fall in water level. The leaves are alternate or connected to the stem in more or less regular whorls. The flowers are hermaphrodite and pollinated by insects and cleistogamy; they appear from May to June. The plant is self-fertile.

Distribution
Featherfoil is found in Europe and northern Asia. The species epithet palustris is Latin for "of the marsh" and indicates its common habitat.

Cultivation
Naturally a bog or marsh plant, most specimens sold have been grown emersed and must be submerged in stages in the aquarium to encourage them to adapt and form submerse leaves. Featherfoil can be kept in a cool or tropical aquarium. A good substrate, light and, if possible, additional CO2 are beneficial. It can be grown in or around ponds, for which it is considered a good oxygenator. Its bushy leaves provide protection for fish and fry. It can grow floating as well, or exposed to sun.

References

Further reading
 Clapham, A.R., Tutin, T.G. and Warburg, E.F. Flora of the British Isles. Cambridge University Press 1962
 Bowler, P., 2002, Water Violet, British Wildlife, Volume 13, No 5: 325 (Colour photograph)

External links
Natural England: Hottonia palustris
BBC Gardening: Hottonia palustris

  TRopica web site

Primulaceae
Aquatic plants
Flora of Europe
Flora of temperate Asia
Medicinal plants     of Europe
Plants described in 1753
Taxa named by Carl Linnaeus